(born October 6, 1957 in Miyagi) is a retired Japanese long jumper, best known for finishing seventh at the 1984 Olympic Games.

International competitions

References

1957 births
Living people
Sportspeople from Miyagi Prefecture
Japanese male long jumpers
Olympic male long jumpers
Olympic athletes of Japan
Athletes (track and field) at the 1984 Summer Olympics
Athletes (track and field) at the 1988 Summer Olympics
Asian Games gold medalists for Japan
Asian Games silver medalists for Japan
Asian Games bronze medalists for Japan
Asian Games gold medalists in athletics (track and field)
Asian Games medalists in athletics (track and field)
Athletes (track and field) at the 1978 Asian Games
Athletes (track and field) at the 1982 Asian Games
Athletes (track and field) at the 1986 Asian Games
Medalists at the 1978 Asian Games
Medalists at the 1982 Asian Games
Medalists at the 1986 Asian Games
Universiade medalists in athletics (track and field)
Universiade silver medalists for Japan
Medalists at the 1979 Summer Universiade
World Athletics Championships athletes for Japan
Japan Championships in Athletics winners